Chaplin Head is a headland between Undine Harbour and Schlieper Bay on the south coast of South Georgia. It was charted by Discovery Investigations in 1926, when the hill above the headland was called Sharp Peak. Following the South Georgia Survey, 1951–57, it was renamed Chaplin Head after Lieutenant Commander John M. Chaplin, Royal Navy (1888–1977), survey officer in RSS Discovery, 1925–27, and in charge of a hydrographic survey party in South Georgia, 1928–30.

References
 

Headlands of South Georgia